Charles or Charlie King may refer to:

Academics and writers

Charles King (Columbia University president) (1789–1867), American academic, politician and newspaper editor
Charles Ray King (1813–1901), American physician and author, son of John Alsop King, grandson of Rufus King
Charles William King (1818–1888), English writer and collector of gems
Charles Glen King (1896–1988), American biochemist
Charles King, pen name of E. Lee Spence (born 1947), American author/editor of non-fiction
Charles King (professor of international affairs) (born 1967), American academic and author

Designers

Charles Brady King (1868–1957), American inventor and automobile pioneer
Charles Spencer King (1925–2010), English designer of Land Rovers

Military

Charles King (general) (1844–1933), American military leader and author
Charles King (British Army officer) (1890–1967), British engineer and army officer
Colonel Charles B. King (c.1910–1944), American intelligence officer killed in World War II (see Camp King § Post World War II (1945-1953))
Charles Monroe King, United States Army soldier and subject of the book A Journal for Jordan: A Story of Love and Honor by Dana Canedy and the upcoming film A Journal for Jordan

Performers

Charles King (musical actor) (1886–1944), American vaudevillian actor
Charles King (character actor) (1895–1957), American film actor
Charlie King (folk singer) (born 1947), American folk singer and activist
Charlie King (The Only Way Is Essex), English participant in scripted reality show

Politicians

Charles D. B. King (1875–1961), President of Liberia
Charles J. King (1925–2016), member of the Florida House of Representatives
Charlie King (politician) (born 1959), American politician and attorney from New York City

Sports

Charles King (English cricketer) (1832–1872), English cricketer
Charles King (New Zealand cricketer) (1847–1917), New Zealand cricketer
Charles King (footballer) (1860–1928), English footballer; played in 1880 FA Cup Final
Charles King (athlete) (1880–1958), American Olympic silver medalist
Charles King (cyclist) (1911–2001), British Olympic cyclist
Charlie King (baseball) (1912–1969), American baseball player
Charlie King (Australian footballer) (born 1926), Australian rules footballer for Geelong
Charlie King (sports broadcaster), first indigenous Australian sports commentator at Olympic Games
Charlie King (footballer, born 1979), Scottish footballer

Others

Charles King (composer) (1687–1748), English composer and musician
Charles Bird King (1785–1862), American portrait painter
Charles W. King (before 1805–after 1849), American merchant in 1837 Morrison incident
Charles Henry King (1853–1930), American businessman and banker in Nebraska
Charles E. King (1874–1950), educator, Hawaii territorial legislator and songwriter
Charles King (1912–1972), American TV executive and founder of King World Productions
Charles King, co-founder and CEO of the nonprofit Housing Works

See also 
King (surname)
King Charles (disambiguation), for kings named Charles